Stuart Forbes may refer to:
 Stuart Forbes (American football)
 Stuart Forbes (rower)